Common names: two-headed snakes.
Micrelaps is a genus of rear-fanged venomous snakes until very recently classified in the family Atractaspididae. The genus is native to Africa and the Middle East, and there are four species that are recognized as being valid. However, a phylogenomic study published in 2023 on the Molecular Phylogenetics and Evolution journal has concluded that the genus should be re-classified into an autonomous family, apart from Atractaspididae, and such taxon would be called Micrelapidae, which would constitute a new Afro-Asian family of snakes.

Description
Species in the genus Micrelaps share the following characters: the maxilla is very short, with two teeth, followed, after an interspace, by a very large grooved fang situated below the eye. The mandibular teeth are longest anteriorly. The head is small, and is not distinct from the neck. The eye is minute, and the pupil is round or vertically subelliptic. The nostril is pierced in a single nasal scale. There is no loreal scale. There are no preocular scales, the prefrontal entering the eye. The body is cylindrical, and the tail is short. The dorsal scales are smooth, without pits, and are in 15 rows at midbody. The ventral scales are rounded. The subcaudal scales are in two rows.

Species
{||cellspacing=0 cellpadding=2 border=1 style="width: 100%; border-collapse: collapse;"
|-
|colspan="100%" align="center" bgcolor="#BBBBFF"|Genus Micrelaps - five species
|-
!bgcolor="#f0f0f0"|Species
!bgcolor="#f0f0f0"|Taxon author
!bgcolor="#f0f0f0"|Subsp.*
!bgcolor="#f0f0f0"|Common name
!bgcolor="#f0f0f0"|Geographic range
|-
|M. bicoloratus
|Sternfeld, 1908
|moyeri
|Kenya two-headed snake
|style="width:35%"|Kenya
|-
|M. boettgeri
|Boulenger, 1896
|align="center"|————
|Boettger's two-headed snake
|style="width:35%"|Sudan, Somalia, Ethiopia, Kenya, Uganda
|-
|M. muelleri
|Boettger, 1880
|align="center"|————
|
|Israel, Syria, Jordan, Lebanon
|-
|M. vaillanti|(Mocquard, 1888)
|align="center"|————
|Somali two-headed snake
|Ethiopia, Kenya, Somalia, eastern Sudan, Tanzania, and Uganda
|-
|}*) Not including the nominate subspeciesT) Type species

References

Further reading
Böttger O (1880). "Die Reptilien und Amphibien von Syrien, Palaestina und Cypern ". Berichte über die Senckenbergische naturforschender Gesellschaft in Frankfurt am Main 1880: 132–219. (Micrelaps'', new genus, p. 136). (in German and Latin).

Atractaspididae
Snake genera
Taxa named by Oskar Boettger
Taxonomy articles created by Polbot